T cell deficiency is a deficiency of T cells, caused by decreased function of individual T cells, it causes an immunodeficiency of cell-mediated immunity. T cells normal function is to help with the human body's immunity, they are one of the two primary types of lymphocytes(the other being B cells).

Symptoms and signs
Presentations differ among causes, but T cell insufficiency generally manifests as unusually severe common viral infections (respiratory syncytial virus, rotavirus), diarrhea, and eczematous or erythrodermatous rashes. Failure to thrive and cachexia are later signs of a T-cell deficiency.

Mechanism
In terms of the normal mechanism of T cell we find that it is a type of white blood cell that has an important role in immunity, and is made from thymocytes. One sees in the partial disorder of T cells that happen due to cell signaling defects, are usually caused by hypomorphic gene defects. Generally, (micro)deletion of 22Q11.2 is the most often seen.

Pathogens of concern 

The main pathogens of concern in T cell deficiencies are intracellular pathogens, including Herpes simplex virus, Mycobacterium and Listeria. Also, intracellular fungal infections are also more common and severe in T cell deficiencies. Other intracellular pathogens of major concern in T cell deficiency are:

Diagnosis
The diagnosis of T cell deficiency can be ascertained in those individuals with this condition via the following:
 Delayed hypersensitivity skin test
 T cell count
 Detection via culture(infection)

Types

Primary or secondary 

 Primary (or hereditary) immunodeficiencies of T cells include some that cause complete insufficiency of T cells, such as severe combined immunodeficiency (SCID), Omenn syndrome, and Cartilage–hair hypoplasia.
 Secondary causes are more common than primary ones. Secondary (or acquired) causes are mainly:
AIDS
Cancer chemotherapy
Lymphoma
Glucocorticoid therapy

Complete or partial deficiency
 Complete insufficiency of T cell function can result from hereditary conditions (also called primary conditions) such as severe combined immunodeficiency (SCID), Omenn syndrome, and cartilage–hair hypoplasia.
 Partial insufficiencies of T cell function include acquired immune deficiency syndrome (AIDS), and hereditary conditions such as DiGeorge syndrome (DGS), chromosomal breakage syndromes (CBSs), and B-cell and T-cell combined disorders such as ataxia-telangiectasia (AT) and Wiskott–Aldrich syndrome (WAS).

Treatment

In terms of the management of T cell deficiency for those individuals with this condition the following can be applied:
 Killed vaccines should be used(not live vaccines in T cell deficiency)
 Bone marrow transplant
 Immunoglobulin replacement
 Antiviral therapy
 Supplemental nutrition

Epidemiology
In the U.S. this defect occurs in about 1 in 70,000, with the majority of cases presenting in early life.
Furthermore, SCID has an incidence of approximately 1 in 66,000 in California.

See also
 B cell deficiency

References

Further reading

External links 
 Pubmed

Immunodeficiency
Immune system disorders
Infection-related cutaneous conditions
Lymphocytes
Lymphocytic disorders
Hematopathology